Heinz Kurt Becker (born 29 June 1950) is an Austrian politician who served as a Member of the European Parliament (MEP) from 2011 until 2019. He is a member of the Austrian People's Party, part of the European People's Party.

Parliamentary service
Committee on Employment and Social Affairs (2011-2012)
Committee on Petitions (2011-)
Delegation for relations with Canada (2011-2019)
Committee on Employment and Social Affairs (2012-2014)
Committee on Civil Liberties, Justice and Home Affairs (2014-2019)

In addition to his committee assignments, Becker served as a member of the European Parliament Intergroup on Trade Unions.

External links

References

1950 births
Living people
Austrian People's Party MEPs
MEPs for Austria 2009–2014
MEPs for Austria 2014–2019